Little Redfish Lake is a name given to two different alpine lakes in central Idaho, both in the Sawtooth National Recreation Area and Custer County.  This article refers in the Big Boulder Creek Watershed of the White Cloud Mountains.  For the article on the other Little Redfish Lake south of Stanley and downstream of Redfish Lake see Little Redfish Lake.

Sawtooth National Forest trail 213 leads to Little Redfish Lake from trail 047 along Big Boulder Creek.

References

See also
 List of lakes of the White Cloud Mountains
 Sawtooth National Forest
 Sawtooth National Recreation Area
 White Cloud Mountains

Lakes of Idaho
Lakes of Custer County, Idaho
Glacial lakes of the United States